HIFK, the Idrottsföreningen Kamraterna, Helsingfors (IFK, Helsingfors) rf (officially abbreviated IFK Helsingfors, colloquially often Helsingfors IFK or Helsingin IFK ) is a multi-sport association based in Helsinki, Finland. Formed in 1897 on the initiative of Georges Doubitsky and fellow students of the Svenska Reallyceum, the Swedish lyceum in Helsinki, it is the oldest continuously-operating Idrottsföreningen Kamraterna (IFK) organization in Finland. HIFK has sections in many sports, including athletics, bandy, bowling, football, ice hockey, and handball.

Bandy 

HIFK Bandy ry oversees the men's and women's representative teams, junior teams and bandy school, and recreational bandy programs. Kauko Rautiainen is chairman of HIFK Bandy ry.

The men's bandy section of HIFK was created in 1907 and the representative team has won the Finnish Championship seventeen times, more than any other club, and the Finnish Cup twice. The team plays in the Bandyliiga and their home arena is Brahenkenttä in the Alppiharju district.

HIFK women's team plays in the Jääpallon naisten SM-sarja (Women's Bandy Finnish Championship Series) and have won the Finnish Championship three times, in 1986, 1987, and 2011.

Ice hockey 

Oy HIFK Hockey Ab is the largest business within the HIFK association, comprising the men’s representative team in the Liiga, the women’s representative team in the Naisten Liiga, an expansive junior organization, and the hREDS eSports team.

eSport 

In November 2016 an esports project was started under the name Helsinki REDS (hREDS).

Athletics 

The Athletics section of HIFK is one of Finland's oldest and most successful athletics clubs.

Handball 

The Handball section of HIFK is one of the pioneers of the sport in Finland. The men's section has won 10 national championships and the women's section 41 national championships. Both teams play their home games at the Helsinki Urheilutalo in the Kallio district of the city.

Football 

The football section of HIFK was established in 1907, and its first team earned promotion to Veikkausliiga for the 2015 season.

Notes

References
Significant content in this article was translated from the existing Finnish Wikipedia article at :fi:HIFK and the existing Swedish Wikipedia article at :sv:HIFK; see their histories for attribution.

External links 
 Official club website  
 Helsinki REDS website

 
Sports clubs in Helsinki
1897 establishments in Finland